Ottawa was a merchant ship launched at Quebec in 1814 that sailed to England and acquired English registry. In 1815 a US privateer captured her. Although the Royal Navy recaptured her, the Vice-admiralty court at Jamaica restored to her original captors. She returned to British ownership and was wrecked in 1822.

Career
A letter dated 21 October 1814 reported to the registry at Quebec that Ottawa had been re-registered at Liverpool.

Ottawa first appeared in Lloyd's Register (LR) in 1815.

 
On 9 March 1815 the US privateer Kemp, Captain Joseph Almeda (or Almeida), captured the British merchantman Ottawa, James Simpson, master, which was off Cuba while sailing from Liverpool to Jamaica with a cargo of porter, soap, potatoes, hams, cheese, etc. On 3 April  and  recaptured Ottawa. The London merchant James Strachan Glennie protested the recapture, acting on behalf of Kemp and Joseph Almeda, arguing that the recapture had occurred during the period the Treaty of Ghent had established for restitution of captures. The Vice admiralty court of Jamaica found for Glennie.

Lloyd's List reported that Ottawa, Simpson,master, had put into Ocoa Bay after the American privateer Kemp had captured her. There boats from a British man of war had cut Ottawa out, and taken her to Jamaica. From Jamaica she had sailed to Savannah, and had arrived there. The 1816 issue of Lloyd's Registed had the annotation "capt." beneath her name.

Ottawa returned to British ownership.

Fate
A letter from Maranaham, dated 25 November 1822, reported that Ottawa, Todd, master, had been wrecked on 3 November on the Island of St Anna. Here crew had been saved. Ottawa was on a voyage from Liverpool to Maranhão.

Notes

Citations

References
 

1814 ships
Ships built in Quebec
Age of Sail merchant ships of England
Captured ships
Maritime incidents in November 1822